The Roman Catholic Diocese of Sidon was a bishopric in the Kingdom of Jerusalem in the 12th and 13th centuries.

Establishment 
Before the arrival of the crusaders to Syria in the late 11th century, the Orthodox bishops of Sidon had been suffragans of the archbishops of Tyre, who were in turn subject to the authority of the Orthodox patriarchs of Antioch. The first crusader king of Jerusalem, Baldwin I captured Sidon with the assistance of Venetian and Norwegian fleets on 5 December 1110. He wanted to ensure that all sees in his kingdom were subject to the Latin patriarchs of Jerusalem. He and Patriarch Ghibbelin, Latin Patriarch of Jerusalem, asked Pope Paschal II to authorize the expansion of the jurisdiction of the see of Jerusalem to include the diocese of Sidon. The Pope accepted their proposal and declared in 1111 that the boundaries of the ecclesiastic provinces should follow the political borders, making Sidon subject to Jerusalem. However, the patriarchs of Antioch, Bernard of Valence, lodged an objection with the Holy See and prevented the appointment of a bishop subject to Jerusalem at Sidon.

From the 14th-century, the Sidon became a Titular see.

Bishops 

 Bernard (1131–1153)
 Amalric ( 1153–1170)
 Odo (1175–1190)
 Raoul of Merencourt (1210–1214)
 Geoffrey Ardel (1236–1247)
 John of Saint Maxentius (1266–1267)
 Adam of Romery ( 1274)

References

Sources 

 
 
 

Sidon
Medieval Lebanon
Catholic Church in the Middle East